{{DISPLAYTITLE:C6H14O6}}
The molecular formula C6H14O6 may refer to:

 Galactitol, a sugar alcohol, the reduction product of galactose
 Iditol, a sugar alcohol which accumulates in galactokinase deficiency
 Mannitol, a sugar alcohol used as a sweetener and medication
 Sorbitol, a sugar alcohol with a sweet taste which the human body metabolizes slowly